|}

The Haldon Gold Cup is a Grade 2 National Hunt steeplechase in Great Britain which is open to horses aged four years or older. It is run at Exeter over a distance of about 2 miles and 1½ furlongs (2 miles, 1 furlong and 109 yards, or 3,520 metres), and during its running there are twelve fences to be jumped. The race is scheduled to take place each year in late October or early November.

The event is named after Haldon, a ridge of high ground in Devon on which Exeter Racecourse is located. The race became a limited handicap in 1996. 

The 2005 edition was marred by the death of Best Mate, a three-time winner of the Cheltenham Gold Cup.

Records
Most successful horse (3 wins):
 Travado – 1993,1994,1995

Leading jockey (4 wins):
 Peter Scudamore – Artifice (1983), 	Admiral's Cup (1986), Sabin du Loir (1990,1991)
 Richard Johnson -  Viking Flagship (1997), Monkerhostin (2005), Ashley Brook (2008), Planet of Sound (2009) 

Leading trainer (8 wins):
 Paul Nicholls – Lake Kariba (1998), Flagship Uberalles (1999), Azertyuiop (2004), Tchico Polos (2010), Vibrato Valtat (2015), Politologue (2017), Greaneteen (2020,2022)

Winners since 1969
 Weights given in stones and pounds.

See also
 Horse racing in Great Britain
 List of British National Hunt races

References
 Racing Post:

External links
 Race Recordings 

National Hunt races in Great Britain
Exeter Racecourse
National Hunt chases